
Year 466 (CDLXVI) was a common year starting on Saturday (link will display the full calendar) of the Julian calendar. At the time, it was known as the Year of the Consulship of Leo and Tatianus (or, less frequently, year 1219 Ab urbe condita). The denomination 466 for this year has been used since the early medieval period, when the Anno Domini calendar era became the prevalent method in Europe for naming years.

Events 
 By place 
 Roman Empire 
 Emperor Leo I repels the Hun invasion of Dacia (modern Romania). They ravage the Balkans but are unable to take Constantinople thanks to the city walls, which are rebuilt and reinforced. 
 Tarasicodissa, an Isaurian officer, comes with evidence that Ardabur (magister militum) is forming a conspiracy against Leo I. Ardabur is arrested for treason.
 Tarasicodissa adopts the Greek name of Zeno and marries Ariadne, eldest daughter of Leo I (approximate date).

 Europe 
 King Theodoric II is killed by his younger brother Euric, who succeeds him on the throne. He conquers Hispania and the harbor city of Marseille (Southern Gaul), adding them to the existing Visigothic Kingdom.
 Euric sends an embassy to the Eastern Roman Empire for recognition of the Visigoth sovereignty. He forms an alliance with the Suebi and the Vandals.
 A council of twelve townships emerges on the islands in the Venetian lagoon, to form a basic system of governance (approximate date). 

 By topic 
 Religion 
 Peter the Fuller is deposed as patriarch of Antioch; Julian is elected as his successor.

Births 
 Arthur, king of the Britons (approximate date)
 Clovis I, first king of the Franks (approximate date) 
 Xu Mian, high official of the Liang Dynasty (d. 535)

Deaths 
 January 1 – Emperor Qianfei, emperor of the Liu Song dynasty (b. 449) 
 Liu Zixun, prince and pretender of Liu Song (b. 456)  
 Lu Huinan, empress dowager of Liu Song (b. 412) 
 Theodoric II, king of the Visigoths
 Yifu Hun, high official of Northern Wei

References